Lihme is a village in Skive Municipality, Denmark.

References

Villages in Denmark
Cities and towns in the Central Denmark Region
Skive Municipality